is a passenger railway station located in the city of Wakayama, Wakayama Prefecture, Japan, operated by the private railway company Nankai Electric Railway.

Lines
Nishinoshō Station is served by the Kada Line, and has the station number "NK44-4"., It is located 5.5 kilometers from the terminus of the line at Kinokawa Station and 8.1 kilometers from Wakayamashi Station.

Station layout
The station consists of one side platform. The station is unattended.

Adjacent stations

History
Nishinoshō Station opened on December 1, 1930.

Passenger statistics
In fiscal 2019, the station was used by an average of 660 passengers daily (boarding passengers only).

Surrounding Area
 Wakayama Nishinosho Naka Post Office
 Kasei Park
 Nippon Steel & Sumitomo Metal Single Dormitory

See also
List of railway stations in Japan

References

External links

 Nishinoshō Station Official Site

Railway stations in Japan opened in 1930
Railway stations in Wakayama Prefecture
Wakayama (city)